Leon Grgic (born 22 January 2006) is an Austrian professional footballer who plays for Sturm Graz II.

Club career 
Leon Grgic first played at Kapfenberger SV, before joining Sturm Graz in 2015. Becoming a prolific goalscorer with the youth teams, he signed his first professional contract with The Blackies in 2021.

After progressing from the under-16 to the under-18 team during the previous season, Grgic was promoted to the reserve team for the 2022–23 season. He made his professional debut for SK Sturm Graz II on the 17 August 2022, replacing  during a 5–2 away 2. Liga win against SKN St. Pölten.

References

External links

Leon Grgic at ÖFB

2006 births
Living people
Austrian footballers
Austria youth international footballers
Association football forwards
People from Bruck an der Mur
Footballers from Styria
2. Liga (Austria) players